High-entropy alloys (HEAs) are alloys that are formed by mixing equal or relatively large proportions of (usually) five or more elements. Prior to the synthesis of these substances, typical metal alloys comprised one or two major components with smaller amounts of other elements. For example, additional elements can be added to iron to improve its properties, thereby creating an iron-based alloy, but typically in fairly low proportions, such as the proportions of carbon, manganese, and others in various steels. Hence, high-entropy alloys are a novel class of materials.  The term "high-entropy alloys" was coined by Taiwanese scientist Jien-Wei Yeh because the entropy increase of mixing is substantially higher when there is a larger number of elements in the mix, and their proportions are more nearly equal. Some alternative names, such as multi-component alloys, compositionally complex alloys and multi-principal-element alloys are also suggested by other researchers.

These alloys are currently the focus of significant attention in materials science and engineering because they have potentially desirable properties.
Furthermore, research indicates that some HEAs have considerably better strength-to-weight ratios, with a higher degree of fracture resistance, tensile strength, and corrosion and oxidation resistance than conventional alloys. Although HEAs have been studied since the 1980s, research substantially accelerated in the 2010s.

Development
Although HEAs were considered from a theoretical standpoint as early as 1981 and 1996, and throughout the 1980s, in 1995 Taiwanese scientist Jien-Wei Yeh came up with his idea for ways of actually creating high-entropy alloys, while driving through the Hsinchu, Taiwan, countryside. Soon after, he decided to begin creating these special alloys in his lab, being in the only region researching these alloys for over a decade. Most countries in Europe, the United States, and other parts of the world lagged behind in the development of HEAs. Significant research interest from other countries did not develop until after 2004 when Yeh and his team of scientists built the world's first high-entropy alloys to withstand extremely high temperatures and pressures. Potential applications include use in state-of-the-art race cars, spacecraft, submarines, nuclear reactors, jet aircraft, nuclear weapons, long range hypersonic missiles, and so on.

A few months later, after the publication of Yeh's paper, another independent paper on high-entropy alloys was published by a team from the United Kingdom composed of Brian Cantor, I. T. H. Chang, P. Knight, and A. J. B. Vincent. Yeh was also the first to coin the term "high-entropy alloy" when he attributed the high configurational entropy as the mechanism stabilizing the solid solution phase. Cantor did the first work in the field in the late 1970s and early 1980s, though he did not publish until 2004. Unaware of Yeh's work, he did not describe his new materials as "high-entropy" alloys, preferring the term "multicomponent alloys". The base alloy he developed, equiatomic FeCrMnNiCo, has been the subject of considerable work in the field, and is known as the "Cantor alloy", with similar derivatives known as Cantor alloys. It was one of the first HEAs to be reported to form a single-phase FCC (face-centred cubic crystal structure) solid solution.

Before the classification of high-entropy alloys and multi-component systems as a separate class of materials, nuclear scientists had already studied a system that can now be classified as a high-entropy alloy: within nuclear fuels Mo-Pd-Rh-Ru-Tc particles form at grain boundaries and at fission gas bubbles. Understanding the behavior of these "five-metal particles" was of specific interest to the medical industry because Tc-99m is an important medical imaging isotope.

Definition
There is no universally agreed-upon definition of a HEA. The originally defined HEAs as alloys containing at least 5 elements with concentrations between 5 and 35 atomic percent. Later research however, suggested that this definition could be expanded. Otto et al. suggested that only alloys that form a solid solution with no intermetallic phases should be considered true high-entropy alloys, because the formation of ordered phases decreases the entropy of the system. Some authors have described four-component alloys as high-entropy alloys while others have suggested that alloys meeting the other requirements of HEAs, but with only 2–4 elements or a mixing entropy between R and 1.5R should be considered "medium-entropy" alloys.

Alloy design
In conventional alloy design, one primary element such as iron, copper, or aluminum is chosen for its properties. Then, small amounts of additional elements are added to improve or add properties. Even among binary alloy systems, there are few common cases of both elements being used in nearly-equal proportions such as Pb-Sn solders. Therefore, much is known from experimental results about phases near the edges of binary phase diagrams and the corners of ternary phase diagrams and much less is known about phases near the centers. In higher-order (4+ components) systems that cannot be easily represented on a two-dimensional phase diagram, virtually nothing is known.

Phase formation
Gibbs' phase rule, can be used to determine an upper bound on the number of phases that will form in an equilibrium system. In his 2004 paper, Cantor created a 20-component alloy containing 5 at% of Mn, Cr, Fe, Co, Ni, Cu, Ag, W, Mo, Nb, Al, Cd, Sn, Pb, Bi, Zn, Ge, Si, Sb, and Mg. At constant pressure, the phase rule would allow for up to 21 phases at equilibrium, but far fewer actually formed. The predominant phase was a face-centered cubic solid-solution phase, containing mainly Fe, Ni, Cr, Co, and Mn. From that result, the FeCrMnNiCo alloy, which forms only a solid-solution phase, was developed.

The Hume-Rothery rules have historically been applied to determine whether a mixture will form a solid solution. Research into high-entropy alloys has found that in multi-component systems, these rules tend to be relaxed slightly. In particular, the rule that solvent and solute elements must have the same crystal structure does not seem to apply, as Fe, Ni, Cr, Co, and Mn have four different crystal structures as pure elements (and when the elements are present in equal concentrations, there can be no meaningful distinction between "solvent" and "solute" elements).

Thermodynamic mechanisms
Phase formation of HEA is determined by thermodynamics and geometry.  When phase formation is controlled by thermodynamics and kinetics are ignored. ΔGmix (Gibbs free energy of mixing) is defined as:

ΔGmix = ΔHmix - TΔSmix

where Hmix is defined as enthalpy of mixing, T is temperature, and Smix is entropy of mixing respectively. ΔHmix  and TΔSmix continuously compete to determine the phase of the HEA material.  Other important factors include atomic size of each element within the HEA, where Hume-Rothery rules and 's three empirical rules for bulk metallic glass play a role.

Disordered solids form when atomic size difference is small and ΔHmix is not negative enough. This is because every atom is about the same size and can easily substitute for each other and ΔHmix is not low enough to form a compound.  More-ordered HEAs form as the size difference between the elements gets larger and ΔHmix gets more negative.  When the size difference of each individual element become too large, bulk metallic glasses form instead of HEAs.  High temperature and high ΔSmix also promote the formation of HEA because they significantly lower ΔGmix, making the HEA easier to form because it is more stable than other phases such as intermetallics.

The multi-component alloys that Yeh developed also consisted mostly or entirely of solid-solution phases, contrary to what had been expected from earlier work in multi-component systems, primarily in the field of metallic glasses. Yeh attributed this result to the high configurational, or mixing, entropy of a random solid solution containing numerous elements. The mixing entropy for a random ideal solid solution can be calculated by:

where R is the ideal gas constant, N is the number of components, and ci is the atomic fraction of component i. From this it can be seen that alloys in which the components are present in equal proportions will have the highest entropy, and adding additional elements will increase the entropy. A five-component, equiatomic alloy will have a mixing entropy of 1.61R.

However, entropy alone is not sufficient to stabilize the solid-solution phase in every system. The enthalpy of mixing (ΔH), must also be taken into account. This can be calculated using:

where  is the binary enthalpy of mixing for A and B. Zhang et al. found, empirically, that in order to form a complete solid solution, ΔHmix should be between -10 and 5 kJ/mol. In addition, Otto et al. found that if the alloy contains any pair of elements that tend to form ordered compounds in their binary system, a multi-component alloy containing them is also likely to form ordered compounds.

Both of the thermodynamic parameters can be combined into a single, unitless parameter Ω:

where Tm is the average melting point of the elements in the alloy. Ω should be greater than or equal to 1.1 to promote solid solution development.

Kinetic mechanisms
The atomic radii of the components must also be similar in order to form a solid solution. Zhang et al. proposed a parameter δ representing the difference in atomic radii:

Formation of a solid-solution phase requires a δ≤6.6%, but some alloys with 4%<δ≤6.6% do form intermetallics.

The multi-element lattice in HEAs is highly distorted because all elements are solute atoms and their atomic radii are different. When the atomic size difference (δ) is sufficiently large, the distorted lattice would collapse and a new phase such as an amorphous structure would be formed. The lattice distortion effect can result in solid solution hardening.

Other properties
For those alloys that do form solid solutions, an additional empirical parameter has been proposed to predict the crystal structure that will form. HEAs are usually FCC (face-centred cubic), BCC (body-centred cubic), HCP (hexagonal close-packed), or a mixture of the above structures, and each structure have their own advantages and disadvantages in terms of mechanical properties.  There are many methods to predict the structure of HEA.  Valence electron concentration (VEC) can be used to predict the stability of the HEA structure.  The stability of physical properties of the HEA is closely associated with electron concentration (this is associated with the electron concentration rule from the Hume-Rothery rules).

When HEA is made with casting, only FCC structures are formed when VEC is larger than 8.  When VEC is between 6.87 and 8, HEA is a mixture of BCC and FCC, and while VEC is below 6.87, the material is BCC.  In order to produce certain crystal structure of HEA, certain phase stabilizing elements can be added.  Experimentally, adding elements such as Al and Cr and help the formation of BCC HEA while Ni and Co can help forming FCC HEA.

Synthesis

High-entropy alloys are difficult to manufacture using extant techniques , and typically require both expensive materials and specialty processing techniques.

High-entropy alloys are mostly produced using methods that depend on the metals phase – if the metals are combined while in a liquid, solid, or gas state.

 Most HEAs have been produced using liquid-phase methods include arc melting, induction melting, and Bridgman solidification.
 Solid-state processing is generally done by mechanical alloying using a high-energy ball mill. This method produces powders that can then be processed using conventional powder metallurgy methods or spark plasma sintering. This method allows for alloys to be produced that would be difficult or impossible to produce using casting, such as AlLiMgScTi.
 Gas-phase processing includes processes such as sputtering or molecular beam epitaxy (MBE), which can be used to carefully control different elemental compositions to get high-entropy metallic or ceramic films.

Additive manufacturing,  can produce alloys with a different microstructure, potentially increasing strength (to 1.3 gigapascals) as well as increasing ductility.

Other techniques include thermal spray, laser cladding, and electrodeposition.

Modeling and simulation
The atomic-scale complexity presents additional challenges to computational modelling of high-entropy alloys. Thermodynamic modeling using the CALPHAD method requires extrapolating from binary and ternary systems. Most commercial thermodynamic databases are designed for, and may only be valid for, alloys consisting primarily of a single element. Thus, they require experimental verification or additional ab initio calculations such as density functional theory (DFT). However, DFT modeling of complex, random alloys has its own challenges, as the method requires defining a fixed-size cell, which can introduce non-random periodicity. This is commonly overcome using the method of "special quasirandom structures", designed to most closely approximate the radial distribution function of a random system, combined with the Vienna Ab initio Simulation Package. Using this method, it has been shown that results of a four-component equiatomic alloy begins to converge with a cell as small as 24 atoms. The exact muffin-tin orbital method with the coherent potential approximation has also been employed to model HEAs. Other techniques include the 'multiple randomly populated supercell' approach, which better describes the random population of a true solid solution (although is far more computationally demanding). This method has also been used to model glassy and amorphous systems without a crystal lattice (including bulk metallic glasses).

Further, modeling techniques are being used to suggest new HEAs for targeted applications. The use of modeling techniques in this 'combinatorial explosion' is necessary for targeted and rapid HEA discovery and application.

Simulations have highlighted the preference for local ordering in some high-entropy alloys and, when the enthalpies of formation are combined with terms for configurational entropy, transition temperatures between order and disorder can be estimated, allowing one to understand when effects like age hardening and degradation of an alloy's mechanical properties may be an issue.

The transition temperature to reach the solid solution (miscibility gap) was recently addressed with the Lederer-Toher-Vecchio-Curtarolo thermodynamic model.

Phase diagram generation
CALPHAD (calculation of phase diagrams) method with reliable thermodynamic data base can be an effective tool when searching for single phase HEAs.  However, this method can be limited since it needs to extrapolate from known binary of ternary phase diagram, this method also does not take account into the process of material synthesis.  Also this method can only predict equilibrium phases.  The phase diagram of HEA can be explored experimentally via High throughput experimentation (HTE).  This method rapidity producing hundreds of samples allowing the researcher to explore a region of composition in one step thus can used to quickly map out the phase diagram of the HEA.  Another way to predict the phase of the HEA is via enthalpy concentration.  This method take account for specific combination of single phase HEA and reject similar combination that have been tried show not to be single phase.  This model uses first principle high throughput density functional theory to calculation the enthalpies.  Thus required no experiment input, and it has shown excelled agreement with reported experimental result.

Properties and potential uses

Mechanical
The crystal structure of HEAs has been found to be the dominant factor in determining the mechanical properties. bcc HEAs typically have high yield strength and low ductility and vice versa for fcc HEAs. Some alloys have been particularly noted for their exceptional mechanical properties. However, room temperature ductility is poor, less is known about other important high temperature properties such as creep resistance, and the density of the alloy is higher than conventional nickel-based superalloys.

This was attributed to the onset of nanoscale twin boundary formation, an additional deformation mechanism that was not in effect at higher temperatures. At ultralow temperatures, inhomogenous deformation by serrations has been reported. As such, it may have applications as a structural material in low-temperature applications or, because of its high toughness, as an energy-absorbing material. However, later research showed that lower-entropy alloys with fewer elements or non-equiatomic compositions may have higher strength or higher toughness. No ductile to brittle transition was observed in the bcc AlCoCrFeNi alloy in tests as low as 77 K.

Al0.5CoCrCuFeNi was found to have a high fatigue life and endurance limit, possibly exceeding some conventional steel and titanium alloys. But there was significant variability in the results, suggesting the material is very sensitive to defects introduced during manufacturing such as aluminum oxide particles and microcracks.

A single-phase nanocrystalline Al20Li20Mg10Sc20Ti30 alloy was developed with a density of 2.67 g cm−3 and microhardness of 4.9 – 5.8 GPa, which would give it an estimated strength-to-weight ratio comparable to ceramic materials such as silicon carbide, though the high cost of scandium limits the possible uses.

Rather than bulk HEAs, small-scale HEA samples (e.g. NbTaMoW micro-pillars) exhibit extraordinarily high yield strengths of 4 – 10 GPa — one order of magnitude higher than that of its bulk form – and their ductility is considerably improved. Additionally, such HEA films show substantially enhanced stability for high-temperature, long-duration conditions (at 1,100 °C for 3 days). Small-scale HEAs combining these properties represent a new class of materials in small-dimension devices potentially for high-stress and high-temperature applications.

In 2018, new types of HEAs based on the careful placement of ordered oxygen complexes, a type of ordered interstitial complexes, have been produced.  In particular, alloys of titanium, hafnium, and zirconium have been shown to have enhanced work hardening and ductility characteristics.

Bala et al. studied the effects of high-temperature exposure on the microstructure and mechanical properties of the Al5Ti5Co35Ni35Fe20 high-entropy alloy. After hot rolling and air-quenching, the alloy was exposed to a temperature range of 650-900 °C for 7 days. The air-quenching caused γ′ precipitation distributed uniformly throughout the microstructure. The high-temperature exposure resulted in growth of the γ′ particles and at temperatures higher than 700 °C, additional precipitation of γ′ was observed. The highest mechanical properties were obtained after exposure to 650 °C with a yield strength of 1050 MPa and an ultimate tensile yield strength of 1370 MPa. Increasing the temperature further decreased the mechanical properties.

Liu et al. studied a series of quaternary non-equimolar high-entropy alloys AlxCo15xCr15xNi70−x with x ranging from 0 to 35%. The lattice structure transitioned from FCC to BCC as Al content increased and with Al content in the range of 12.5 to 19.3 at%, the γ′ phase formed and strengthened the alloy at both room and elevated temperatures. With Al content at 19.3 at%, a lamellar eutectic structure formed composed of γ′ and B2 phases. Due to high γ′ phase fraction of 70 vol%, the alloy had a compressive yield strength of 925 MPa and fracture strain of 29% at room temperature and high yield strength at high temperatures as well with values of 789, 546, and 129 MPa at the temperatures of 973, 1123, and 1273K.

In general, refractory high-entropy alloys have exceptional strength at elevated temperatures but are brittle at room temperature. The HfNbTaTiZr alloy is an exception with plasticity of over 50% at room temperature. However, its strength at high temperature is insufficient. With the aim of increasing high temperature strength Chien-Chuang et al. modified the composition of HfNbTaTiZr, and studied the mechanical properties of the refractory high-entropy alloys: HfMoTaTiZr and HfMoNbTaTiZr. Both alloys have simple BCC structure. Their experiments showed that the yield strength of HfMoNbTaTiZr had a yield strength 6 times greater than HfNbTaTiZr at 1200 °C with a fracture strain of 12% retained in the alloy at room temperature.

Electrical and magnetic
CoCrCuFeNi is an fcc alloy that was found to be paramagnetic. But upon adding titanium, it forms a complex microstructure consisting of fcc solid solution, amorphous regions and nanoparticles of Laves phase, resulting in superparamagnetic behavior. High magnetic coercivity has been measured in a BiFeCoNiMn alloy. There are several magnetic high-entropy alloys which exhibit promising soft magnetic behavior with strong mechanical properties. Superconductivity was observed in TaNbHfZrTi alloys, with transition temperatures between 5.0 and 7.3 K.

Other
The high concentrations of multiple elements leads to slow diffusion. The activation energy for diffusion was found to be higher for several elements in CoCrFeMnNi than in pure metals and stainless steels, leading to lower diffusion coefficients.
Some equiatomic multicomponent alloys have also been reported to show good resistance to damage by energetic radiation. High-entropy alloys are investigated for hydrogen storage applications. Some high-entropy alloys such as TiZrCrMnFeNi show fast and reversible hydrogen storage at room temperature with good storage capacity for commercial applications. The high-entropy materials have high potential for a wider range of energy applications, particularly in the form of high-entropy ceramics.

High-entropy alloy films (HEAFs)

Introduction 
Most HEAs are prepared by vacuum arc melting, which obtains larger grain sizes like µm-level. As a result, studies regarding high-performance high entropy alloy films (HEAFs) have attracted more material scientists. Compared to the preparation methods of the HEA bulk materials, HEAFs are easily achieved by rapid solidification with a faster cooling rate of 10^9 K/s. A rapid cooling rate can limit the diffusion of the constituent elements, inhibit phase separation, favor the formation of the single solid-solution phase or even an amorphous structure, and obtain a smaller grain size (nm) than those of HEA bulk materials (µm). So far, lots of technologies have been used to fabricate the HEAFs such as spraying, laser cladding, electrodeposition, and magnetron sputtering. Magnetron Sputtering technique is the most-used method to fabricate the HEAFs. An inert gas (Ar) is introduced in a vacuum chamber and it’s accelerated by a high voltage that is applied between the substrate and the target. As a result, a target is bombarded by the energetic ions and some atoms are ejected from the target surface, then these atoms reach the substrate and condense on the substrate to form a thin film. The composition of each constituent element in HEAFs can be controlled by a given target and the operational parameters like power, gas flow, bias, and working distance between substrate and target during film deposition. Also, the oxide, nitride, and carbide films can be readily prepared by introducing reactive gases such as O2, N2, and C2H2. Until now, Li et al. summarized three routes to prepare HEAFs via the magnetron sputtering technique. First, a single HEA target can be used to fabricate the HEAFs. The related contents of the as-deposited films are approximately equal to that of the original target alloy even though each element has a different sputtering yield with the help of the pre-sputtering step. However, preparing a single HEA target is very time-consuming and difficult. For example, it’s hard to produce an equiatomic CoCrFeMnNi alloy target due to the high evaporation rate of Mn. Thus, the additional amount of Mn is hard to expect and calculate to ensure each element is equiatomic. Secondly, HEAFs can be synthesized by co-sputtering deposition with various metal targets. A wide range of chemical compositions can be controlled by varying the processing conditions such as power, bias, gas flow, etc. Based on the published papers, lots of researchers doped different quantities of elements such as Al, Mo, V, Nb, Ti, and Nd into the CoCrFeMnNi system, which can modify the chemical composition and structure of the alloy and improve the mechanical properties. These HEAFs were prepared by co-sputtering deposition with a single CoCrFeMnNi alloy and Al/Ti/V/Mo/Nb targets. However, it needs trial and error to obtain the desired composition. Take CoCrFeMnNiAlx films as an example. The crystalline structure changed from the single FCC phase for x = 0.07 to duplex FCC + BCC phases for x = 0.3, and eventually, to a single BCC phase for x = 1.0. The whole process was manipulated by varying both powers of CoCrFeMnNi and Al targets to obtain desired compositions, showing a phase transition from FCC to BCC phase with increasing Al contents. The last one is via the powder targets. The compositions of the target are simply adjusted by altering the weight fractions of the individual powders, but these powders must be well-mixed to ensure homogeneity. AlCoCrCuFeNi films were successfully deposited by sputtering pressed power targets.

Recently, there are more researchers investigated the mechanical properties of the HEAFs with nitrogen incorporation due to superior properties like high hardness. As above-mentioned, nitride-based HEAFs can be synthesized via magnetron sputtering by incorporating N2 and Ar gases into the vacuum chamber. Adjusting the nitrogen flow ratio, RN = N2/(Ar + N2), can obtain different amounts of nitrogen. Most of them increased the nitrogen flow ratio to study the correlation between phase transformation and mechanical properties.

Hardness and related modulus values 
Both values of hardness and related modulus like reduced modulus (Er) or elastic modulus (E) will significantly increase through the magnetron sputtering method. This is because the rapid cooling rate can limit the growth of grain size, i.e., HEAFs have smaller grain sizes compared to bulk counterparts, which can inhibit the motion of dislocation and then lead to an increase in mechanical properties such as hardness and elastic modulus. For instance, CoCrFeMnNiAlx films were successfully prepared by the co-sputtering method. The as-deposited CoCrFeMnNi film (Al0) exhibited a single FCC structure with a lower hardness of around 5.71 GPa, and the addition of a small amount of Al atoms resulted in an increase to 5.91 GPa in the FCC structure of Al0.07. With the further addition of Al, the hardness increased drastically to 8.36 GPa in the duplex FCC + BCC phases region. When the phase transformed to a single BCC structure, the Al1.3 film reached a maximum hardness of 8.74 GPa. As a result, the structural transition from FCC to BCC led to hardness enhancements with the increasing Al content. It is worth noting that Al-doped CoCrFeMnNi HEAs have been processed and their mechanical properties have been characterized by Xian et al. and the measured hardness values are included in Hsu et al. work for comparison. Compared to Al-doped CoCrFeMnNi HEAs, Al-doped CoCrFeMnNi HEAFs had a much higher hardness, which could be attributed to the much smaller size of HEAFs (nm vs. µm). Also, the reduced modulus in Al0 and Al1.3 are 172.84 and 167.19 GPa, respectively.

In addition, the RF-sputtering technique was capable of depositing CoCrFeMnNiTix HEAFs by co-sputtering of CoCrFeMnNi alloy and Ti targets. The hardness increased drastically to 8.61 GPa for Ti0.2 by adding Ti atoms to the CoCrFeMnNi alloy system, suggesting good solid solution strengthening effects. With the further addition of Ti, the Ti0.8 film had a maximum hardness of 8.99 GPa. The increase in hardness was due to both the lattice distortion effect and the presence of the amorphous phase that was attributed to the addition of the larger Ti atoms to the CoCrFeMnNi alloy system. This is different from CoCrFeMnNiTix HEAs because the bulk alloy has intermetallic precipitate in the matrix. The reason is the difference in cooling rate, i.e., the preparation method of the bulk HEAs has slower cooling rate and thus intermetallic compound will appear in HEAs. Instead, HEAFs have higher cooling rate and limit the diffusion rate, so they seldom have intermetallic phases. And the reduced modulus in Ti0.2 and Ti0.8 are 157.81 and 151.42 GPa, respectively. Other HEAFs were successfully fabricated by the magnetron sputtering technique and the hardness and the related modulus values are listed in Table 1.

For nitride-HEAFs, Huang et al. prepared (AlCrNbSiTiV)N films and investigated the effect of nitrogen content on structure and mechanical properties. They found that both values of hardness (41 GPa) and elastic modulus (360 GPa) reached a maximum when RN = 28%. The (AlCrMoTaTiZr)Nx film deposited at RN = 40% with the highest hardness of 40.2 GPa and elastic modulus of 420 GPa. Chang et al. fabricated (TiVCrAlZr)N on silicon substrates under different RN = 0 ~ 66.7%. At RN = 50%, the hardness and elastic modulus of the films reached maximum values of 11 and 151 GPa. Liu et al. studied the (FeCoNiCuVZrAl)N HEAFs and increased the RN ratio from 0 to 50%. They observed both values of hardness and elastic modulus exhibited maxima of 12 and 166 GPa with an amorphous structure at RN = 30%. Other related nitride-based HEAFs are summarized in Table 2. Compared to pure metallic HEAFs (Table 1), most nitride-based films have larger hardness and elastic muduls due to the formation of binary compound consisting of nitrogen. However, there are still some films possessing relatively low hardness, which are smaller than 20 GPa, The reason is the inclusion of non-nitride-forming elements.

Until now, there are lots of studies focused on the HEAFs and designed different compositions and techniques. The grain size, phase transformation, structure, densification, residual stress, and the content of nitrogen, carbon, and oxygen also can affect the values of hardness and elastic modulus. Therefore, they still delve into the correlation between the microstructures and mechanical properties and the related applications.

Table 1. The published papers regarding the pure metallic HEAFs and their phase, hardness and related modulus values via magnetron sputtering method.

Table 2. Current publications regarding the nitride-based HEAFs and their structures, the related hardness and elastic modulus values.

See also
 Amorphous metal
 High-entropy-alloy nanoparticles
 Nanocrystalline material
 Hume-Rothery rules

References

Alloys
Chemical physics
Materials science
Statistical mechanics
Taiwanese inventions
Thermodynamic entropy